Spangdahlem is a municipality in the district of Bitburg-Prüm, in Rhineland-Palatinate, western Germany. It is part of the Verbandsgemeinde Speicher. The USAF Spangdahlem Air Base is nearby.

Spang village is on one side of the Spanger brook while Dahlem is on the other side.

References

Bitburg-Prüm